The 2011 Open 88 Contrexéville was a professional tennis tournament played on clay courts. It was the 5th edition of the tournament which was part of the 2011 ITF Women's Circuit. It took place in Contrexéville, France between 11 and 17 July 2011.

WTA entrants

Seeds

 1 Rankings are as of July 4, 2011.

Other entrants
The following players received wildcards into the singles main draw:
  Marion Gaud
  Estelle Guisard
  Anaeve Pain
  Morgane Pons

The following players received entry from the qualifying draw:
  Indire Akiki
  Estelle Cascino
  Céline Cattaneo
  Jessica Ginier

The following players received entry by a lucky loser spot:
  Fiona Gervais

Champions

Singles

 Iryna Brémond def.  Stéphanie Foretz Gacon, 6–4, 6–7(1–7), 6–2

Doubles

 Valentyna Ivakhnenko /  Kateryna Kozlova def.  Erika Sema /  Roxane Vaisemberg, 2–6, 7–5, [12–10]

References
Official Website

External links
ITF Search 

2011 ITF Women's Circuit
2011 in French tennis
2011